Sugar Ray is an American alternative rock music group from Newport Beach, California. They have released a total of six studio albums, two compilation albums, and nineteen singles.

Their most successful album is 1999's 14:59, which was certified triple platinum by the Recording Industry Association of America. It features the Top 10 singles "Every Morning" and "Someday". The songs peaked at number 3 and number 7 on the Billboard Hot 100, respectively.

Studio albums

Compilation albums

Singles

Notes

References

Discographies of American artists
Rock music group discographies